Societatea Pentru Exploatări Technice or SET ("Technical Development Society")  was a Romanian aircraft manufacturer. It was the second biggest Romanian pre-war aircraft manufacturer, after Industria Aeronautică Română (IAR).

History
The Societatea Pentru Exploatări Tehnice was established in Bucharest in 1923 by Grigore Zamfirescu as a general machinery manufacturing plant.  It soon specialised in building aircraft to its founder's design, supplying the Romanian Air Force with trainers during the mid-1930s. At the peak of aircraft production, Zamfirescu changed the company's name to Fabrica de Avioane SET.

In the late 1930s, SET abandoned producing its own designs, and manufactured a number of IAR and foreign types under licence, including the IAR 27, IAR 39, Fleet 10, and Nardi FN.305. In 1938, the company made a deal with the Romanian government that would have seen it relocate its manufacturing facilities to Moldavia, with the government promising to purchase a minimum order of aircraft each year from the new plant. This venture was to have been called "Industria Nationala Aeronautica" ("National Aeronautical Industry"), but it failed to materialise when the Second World War intervened. During the war, SET built Heinkel He 111s under licence.

SET continued to maintain and repair aircraft until the end of World War II, after which it continued business for a time outside the aeronautics industry.

Products

See also
Industria Aeronautică Română (IAR)
Întreprinderea de Construcții Aeronautice Românești (ICAR)
Aviation in Romania

References

Notes

Bibliography

 
 

Vehicle manufacturing companies established in 1923
Defunct aircraft manufacturers of Romania
Greater Romania
1923 establishments in Romania
Vehicle manufacturing companies disestablished in 1945
1945 disestablishments in Romania
Companies based in Bucharest